Prudent is both a given name and a surname. Notable people with the name include:

Given name:
Prudent de Narbonne (died c. 257), Archdeacon of Narbonne
Prudent Beaudry (1818–1893), mayor of Los Angeles
Prudent Carpentier (born 1922), Canadian politician
Prudent Joye (1913–1980), French track and field runner

Surname:
Émile Prudent (1817–1863), French pianist and composer

See also
List of people known as the Prudent